Watson Settlement Bridge was an historic covered bridge in eastern Littleton, Maine, United States.  Built in 1911, it was one of the youngest of Maine's few surviving covered bridges.  It formerly carried Framingham Road over the Meduxnekeag River, but was closed to traffic, the road passing over a modern bridge to its south.  It was listed on the National Register of Historic Places in 1970. It was destroyed by fire on July 19, 2021.

Description and history
The Watson Settlement Bridge was located in southeastern Littleton, a rural community in southern Aroostook County. The Meduxnekeag River flows north from Houlton into southeastern Littleton before turning east and crossing the international border into New Brunswick, Canada. Framingham Road, which the bridge formerly carried, crosses just south of the bridge on a modern structure. The bases of these structures are rubblestone that has been reinforced with concrete, with a  top section that was contained within a timber cribwork. The support system for the two spans was Howe trusses. The exterior of the bridge was finished in vertical siding, and the roof was shingled.

The bridge appears to be the first built at this location, no bridges having been marked on earlier maps of the area.   It was built in 1911, and was attended by legal action between the county and the town over the cost of building its approaches, which was ultimately borne by the town.  The bridge was closed to vehicular traffic with the construction of the adjacent bridge in 1984.

On July 19, 2021, the bridge was destroyed by fire.  Although arson is suspected the incident is still under investigation.

See also
National Register of Historic Places listings in Aroostook County, Maine
List of bridges on the National Register of Historic Places in Maine
List of Maine covered bridges

References

Covered bridges on the National Register of Historic Places in Maine
Bridges completed in 1911
Transportation buildings and structures in Aroostook County, Maine
1911 establishments in Maine
National Register of Historic Places in Aroostook County, Maine
Road bridges on the National Register of Historic Places in Maine
Wooden bridges in Maine
Howe truss bridges in the United States